, also known as the  or as , was a Japanese waka poet of the mid-Heian period. One of her poems was included in the Ogura Hyakunin Isshu.

Biography 

She is accordingly frequently referred to as the mother of the Honorary Grand Minister.

Her other nickname, Kō no Naishi, is a combination of the first character of her patronymic family name —  — and her position serving Emperor En'yū, .

She died in 996.

Poetry 
Five of her poems were included in imperial anthologies from the Shūi Wakashū onwards.

The following poem by her was included as the 54th in the Ogura Hyakunin Isshu:

References

Sources 
 
McMillan, Peter. 2010 (1st ed. 2008). One Hundred Poets, One Poem Each. New York: Columbia University Press.
Suzuki Hideo, Yamaguchi Shin'ichi, Yoda Yasushi. 2009 (1st ed. 1997). Genshoku: Ogura Hyakunin Isshu. Tokyo: Bun'eidō.

External links 
Takashina no Takako (also listed as Gidōsanshi no haha) on Kotobank.

10th-century Japanese poets
10th-century Japanese women writers
People of Heian-period Japan
Ladies-in-waiting of Heian-period Japan
Japanese nobility
Japanese women poets
Articles containing Japanese poems
Hyakunin Isshu poets
Year of birth unknown
Date of death unknown